Mehdi Pakdel (born 1 July 1980) is an Iranian actor.

Career
Mehdi Pakdel lived in his hometown until the age of 17 when he left for the capital, Tehran, to pursue a career in arts.

While studying graphic arts at the Islamic Azad University, he designed a few theatrical posters and later established his own graphic studio to broaden his field of work.

His first stage appearance was in 1997, after which he began to pursue an acting career.

While his main focus has been on stage acting, he had several cinematic and television roles which gained him nationwide fame.

Pakdel has appeared in the series ‘The Scarlet Pearl’ (2004), ‘The Silence of the Sea’ (2005), ‘The First Night of Peace’ (2005), ‘The Innocent Ones’ (2008), ‘The Night Shall Pass’ (2008), ‘Missing’ (2010), ‘Setayesh’ (2009-2010), and ‘Kimiya’ (2013-2015).

He has also acted in a number of movies, including ‘Blue’ (2000), ‘Fish Fall in Love’ (2004), ‘Hardships of the Maiden’ (2006), ‘Trouble’ (2007), ‘Tambourine’ (2007), ‘The Snitch’ (2008), ‘Without Permission’ (2010), ‘The Freeway’ (2010), ‘A Decent Ceremony’ (2011), and ‘Muhammad: The Messenger of God’ (2014).

Personal life
Pakdel was initially married to actress Behnoosh Tabatabaei. They met in March 2007, and got married  in 2011. They divorced in 2016. In 2020, reports of his marriage to Rana Azadivar surfaced in the media.

Filmography

Film

Web

References

External links

Iranian male film actors
Actors from Isfahan
Iranian male stage actors
1980 births
Living people
Iranian male television actors
21st-century Iranian male actors
Islamic Azad University, Central Tehran Branch alumni